Louis Cyr  (born Cyprien-Noé Cyr, October 10, 1863 - November 10, 1912) was a Canadian strongman with a career spanning the late 19th and early 20th centuries. His recorded feats, including lifting  (1/4 ton) with one finger and backlifting (2 tons), show Cyr to be, according to former International Federation of BodyBuilding and Fitness chairman Ben Weider as stated in 2000, the strongest man ever.

Early years 
Cyr was born in Saint-Cyprien-de-Napierville, Quebec, Canada. Coming from a French-Acadian family, he began developing his extraordinary strength at an early age. From the age of twelve Cyr worked in a lumber camp during the winters and on the family's farm the rest of the year. Discovering his exceptional strength at a very young age, he impressed his fellow workers with his feats of strength. After learning of the tale, Cyr attempted to mimic the practice of legendary strongman Milo of Croton, who as a child carried a calf on his shoulders, continuing to carry it as it grew into a full-grown bull and he into a grown man. Cyr's calf, however, bolted one day, kicking him in his back, after which he instead began carrying a sack of grain  every day, adding  each day. According to one of his biographers, his mother decided "He should let his hair grow, like Samson in the Bible".  She curled it regularly.

Louis started his strong man career at the age of 17, after some publicity came about due to an incident when the young Louis was reported to have lifted a farmer's heavily laden wagon out of the mire in which it had become stuck. He was matched in a contest against Michaud of Quebec, who was recognized as Canada's strongest man of the time. Cyr beat him in tests of lifting of heavy stones by hoisting a granite boulder weighing .

In 1878 the Cyr family immigrated to Lowell, Massachusetts in the United States. In Lowell, Cyr changed his name from Cyprien-Noé to Louis, as it was easier to pronounce in English. Again his great strength brought him fame. He entered his first strongman contest in Boston at age 22, lifting a horse off the ground; the fully grown male horse was placed on a platform with 2 iron bars attached enabling Cyr to obtain a better grip. The horse weighed at least .

Rise to fame 

In 1882, while working as a logger, Louis married Melina (née Gilbert dit Comtois). The following year he and his wife returned to Lowell, hoping to capitalize on his fame there. A tour of the Maritimes was organized, and while it may have benefited the organizer, Cyr gained no profit financially. He then began touring Quebec with his family in a show they called "The Troupe Cyr".

Soon proving his immense strength, he was urged by friends to enter the exciting, albeit highly precarious world of professional strong men, lifting mainly crude solid or shot-filled weights.

From 1883 to 1885, Cyr served as a police officer in Montreal, Quebec. Following this, he went on tour with a troupe that included a wrestler, a boxer, and a weightlifter. He entered a strongman competition in March 1886, at Quebec City, against the reigning Canadian strongman, David Michaud.

With little reward at this early foray into professional weightlifting, Louis was forced to seek other employment. Cyr became a police officer after breaking up a knife fight and carrying both participants to the police station.

Prudent with his earnings, Louis left the police force and purchased a tavern/restaurant in St. Cunégonde, where he also featured a gymnasium that became a mecca for strength athletes and fighters. Cyr was well acquainted with John L. Sullivan, being one of the few to defy Sullivan's commands to drink when he drank. Sullivan was known as The Boston Strong Boy and was very powerful, but not in Cyr's class. Cyr, happy in his own environment, beat all comers when challenged to perform.

Cyr's exploits had been well publicized in the 'Pink Un' or Police Gazette published by Richard K. Fox, the proprietor and promoter of other strength athletes, e.g. Travis, Eugen Sandow, etc. Fox offered a side bet of $5,000 to anyone who could beat Cyr at any of his strength feats. Promoted by Fox, Louis went on tour circa 1885–1891 beating, amongst others: Sebastian Miller, Bienkowski, or Cyclops, August Johnson, and Richard Pennell, plus continually challenging, without success, Eugen Sandow, with a genuine diamond studded belt to be awarded to the winner, should such an event ever take place. It never did. Sandow avoided any such challenges throughout his esteemed career after early mistakes, like the time he was beaten by McCann.

There was no doubt that Cyr was an unusual man regarding size and measurements, the latter often causing debate. Sargent listed Cyr's height as 5'8.5". Other measurements, most on the conservative side as compared to other biographers, were neck – , biceps – , forearms – , wrists – , chest (normal) – , chest expanded – , waist - , hips – , thighs – , knees – 17", and calves - , far short of the quoted 28", but perhaps a possible 23" later when of higher body weight. Ankle  and Shoulder width with calipers ... across the deltoids . The above details were just one set of figures relating to Cyr's size, others being recorded by Willoughby when for example Cyr was 47 years old (in 1910) gave him calf 23", neck 22 3/4", biceps 21 1/2". chest normal 59 1/2" and thighs 33" with other parts to match the increase in weight, being at the time a heavier 365 lbs. Ben Weider, who was privileged to access family archives, was even more generous giving arm size , forearms , and calves, the disputed , following a similar line to Jowett.

Reputation as a Strongman 

While several of Cyr's feats of strength may have been exaggerated over the years, some were documented and remain impressive.
These included:
 lifting a platform on his back holding 18 men for a total of 
 lifting a  weight with one finger
 pushing a freight car up an incline
 At 19 years old, he lifted a rock from ground up to his shoulder, officially weighted at 514 pounds

Backlift
Perhaps his greatest feat occurred in 1895, when he was reported to have lifted  on his back in Boston by putting 18 men on a platform and lifting them. One of his most memorable displays of strength occurred in Montreal on 12 October 1891. Louis resisted the pull of four draught horses (two in each hand) as grooms stood cracking their whips to get the horses to pull harder, a feat he again demonstrated in Ottawa with Queen Victoria's team of draught horses during her royal visit. While in Ottawa he volunteered with the police when they took deputies to round up a local gang of miscreants; they turned him away claiming he would be too slow due to his bulk. He challenged the regular officers to a foot race, beating the majority, and they took him on.

He patrolled as a police officer between 1883 and 1885 in Sainte-Cunégonde, known now as Petite-Bourgogne (Little Burgundy) in Montreal. Both the Parc Louis-Cyr and the Place des Hommes-Forts ("Strongmen's Square") are named after him. Statues of him are located at Place des Hommes-Forts and the Musée de la Civilisation in Quebec City. The high school in his hometown of Napierville is also named after him.

Through no fault of his own, many of Cyr's lifts, like his measurements, have been exaggerated or misquoted. In particular, his celebrated back lift done in Boston, of 18 men on a platform, is usually generously estimated at 4,300 lb, which allowing for a very heavy platform of at most 500 lb, meant that each man on average would have weighed approximately 211 lb.

Cyr Dumbbell
Cyr was also credited with side pressing  with one arm (the right), a lift witnessed by Britain's great champion Tom Pevier, who described it more like a 'Jerk Press.' The dumbbell, a huge thick-handled one, was lifted to the shoulders with two hands, before the single-handed overhead move. Cyr's dumbbells were often so unwieldy that many respectable strongmen  were unable to lift them off the floor, let alone lift them overhead.

One particular dumbbell of Cyr's weighed, when empty, . It was the same bell that had defeated a drove of former strength athletes, and it was exchanged by its owner, 280 lb. police chief Joseph Moquin of Quebec (who could and did bent press the weight) for a modern set of York weights. Thus, it came into the possession of the late Bob Hoffman and Mike Dietz. According to Strength & Health magazine, Hoffman, after several attempts, was able to bent press it, as did the much lighter 150 lb. Sig Klein. John Grimek later also bent pressed it, half a dozen times or so one afternoon, when the weight was increased to 269.5 lb, by adding, as it happened, the lead type from Mark Berrys' classic tome Physical Training Simplified. Hence the reason the book was never reprinted.

Cyr was a big man in all ways, both heart and size, being a great trencherman, eating more than four normal men. Up to 6 lb of meat at one meal ... a genuine gourmand, increasing weight enormously in his later years. His lightest bodyweight was when he competed against August Johnson, then just 270 lb, although his normal contest condition was nearer 320 lb. Cyr's wife, Melina, by contrast, never weighed more than 100 lb.

In 1886 Cyr met and defeated Richard Pennell, then Pennell being 40, and Louis just 23. In 1888 on 1 October at Berthierville, Quebec, he lifted 3,536 lb/1, 604 kg of pig iron for his first record in the back lift.

Horse resisting
On 1 December 1891 at Sohmer Park in Montreal, before some 10,000 people, Cyr resisted the pull of four draught horses, two on each side, despite grooms cracking their whips to encourage the horses to pull harder and strain their haunches.

In January 1892, Cyr embarked in England with partner Horace Barré, arousing much interest and curiosity at his London debut at the Royal Aquarium, with 5,000 people packing the theater to watch Cyr's act and witness his open challenge to the wide world of strongmen, many celebrities of which were in the audience, with a side wager of £1,000 (Equivalent to about £98,070 as of 2015). It was on this historical occasion, on 19 January 1892 that Cyr pressed the pre-mentioned 273.75 lb. dumbbell. Many years later Doc Aumont, son-in-law of Louis, loaned Cyr's famous dumbbell to the Weider's Your Physique office in Montreal for a month, during which time over 500 people tried and failed to lift the weight.

During his first London show, many other feats followed, all exceeding contemporary records, culminating in the famous Backlift. Placing a number of men upon a heavy platform resting across two trestles, Louis ducked beneath the platform, placed his back below the center, and raised both the contraption and the passengers clear off the trestles. Weight on this occasion was estimated at 3,635 lb. Traveling extensively throughout the UK he also visited Scotland, raising and carrying for a distance one of the famed Dinnie Stones. Cyr was very popular in Britain, being feted by celebrities and Royalty alike, including the Prince of Wales and Queen Victoria.

After returning to the U.S.A. on 27 May, Cyr did his best back lift in Boston, with over 4,000 lb estimated, consisting of 18 'bulky' men.

Clean and jerk
During his most active period, circa 1896, on March 31 he did a clean and jerk (the clean is a misnomer) of 347 lb, then a World record, without science or skill, little if any dipping.

Reputable witness Oscar Mathes said the lift was closer to a straight-legged press. Cyr did a one-handed deadlift with a dumbbell weighing , made harder by the fact that the bar was 1.5 inches thick. Some authors often credit him with holding out with one arm.- . He also dumbbell pressed 162 lb for 36 reps, did a one finger lift, first with 552 lb and the next day made it . Lifted via one hand, style not specified, but most suspect using hand and thigh method, . plus again, using hand and thigh, .

For years Louis pictured himself as a modern Biblical Samson with tresses to match. In the folds of his long hair he would tie three fifty-pound weights, one on each side, and one in the center, with the three weights dangling from his scalp, he would also spin around, swirling the weights around his head. By co-incidence on his visit to Britain, the top of the pops was a ditty entitled 'Get Your Hair Cut'...Louis must have taken the hint, as afterwards he always sported short hair.

More power of the arm and shoulder was demonstrated by his stunt of stacking four fifty pound weights one on top of the other on his half flexed arm, balancing them whilst walking across the room.

Wrestling a giant
Cyr learned boxing and wrestling for a match. While in Montréal, Que., 25 March 1901, Louis Cyr wrestled Édouard Beaupré, who was known as a giant man. Cyr won.

Death

By 1904 Cyr's health began to fail due to excessive eating and inactivity. He slimmed down as best he could for his last contest of strength, with Hector De Carrie. Cyr retained his title and retired unvanquished.

Cyr died on November 10, 1912, in Montreal, of chronic nephritis and was interred at St-Jean-De-Matha. Great homage was paid by all of Canada, with immense crowds attending the funeral and floral tributes coming from all over the world.

He was portrayed by Antoine Bertrand in the 2013 biographical film Louis Cyr, l'homme le plus fort du monde.

World records
As shown in movie Louis Cyr
 Crucifix:  left hand and   right hand
 One-handed snatch:  
 One-handed press: 
 Back lift: 
 Two-handed lift:

References

Bibliography
 Weider, B. 1976. The Strongest Man in History: Louis Cyr, Amazing Canadian. Translation of Louis Cyr, l’homme le plus fort du monde. Vancouver: Mitchell Press.
 Debon, Nicolas. 2007. The Strongest Man in the World: Louis Cyr. Toronto: Groundwood Books.

External links

 Heroes of Yore and Lore: Canadian Heroes in Fact and Fiction
 Sandow Plus website featuring a link to a vintage biography of Cyr..

1863 births
1912 deaths
Canadian folklore
Canadian strength athletes
Deaths from nephritis
People associated with physical culture
People from Montérégie
Persons of National Historic Significance (Canada)
Sportspeople from Quebec
Canadian male sport wrestlers
French Quebecers
People from Lowell, Massachusetts